Reisabad or Raisabad may refer to:
 Reisabad, Eslamiyeh, Kerman Province
 Raisabad, Khenaman, Kerman Province
 Raisabad, Mazandaran
 Raisabad, Yazd